Vincent Scott Elarton (born February 23, 1976) is a retired right-handed pitcher. He played for the Houston Astros (–), Colorado Rockies (2001–), Cleveland Indians (2004–) and the Kansas City Royals (–)

Playing career

Minor leagues; Houston Astros (1994–2001)
Elarton was chosen by the Astros in the first round of the  Major League Baseball Draft (25th overall) when he was 18 years old.

He spent most of 1998 as a relief pitcher and registered a 3.32 earned run average,  but gave up the game-winning run in the pivotal Game 3 of the National League Division Series against the eventual league champion San Diego Padres. Elarton started  in the bullpen. He was moved to the starting rotation in early July and recorded a 3.48 ERA and 9–5 record.

Elarton had shoulder surgery after the 1999 season and started  on the disabled list and in Minor League rehabilitation. Despite the injury, he had the best season of his career in 2000, posting a 17–7 record for a poor Astros team that compiled only a 72–90 record.  Winning twice as many games as any other pitcher on the team at the hitter-friendly Enron Field while posting a 4.81 ERA, he was named the team's Pitcher of the Year.

In 2001, Elarton's ERA rose to 7.14 in 20 starts for the Astros, compiling a record of 4–8 before his trade to the Rockies.

Colorado Rockies (2001–2004)
He was traded to the Rockies for Pedro Astacio at the trading deadline, returning Elarton to his home state of Colorado. The Rockies' hitter-friendly Coors Field stadium did little to improve his ERA, which finished at 7.06 as he was shut down due to shoulder discomfort, appearing in only 4 games for the Rockies.  He also finished the season at fifth-worst in the National League in home runs allowed and eighth-worst in earned runs allowed.

Elarton had major shoulder surgery and missed the entire  season. He then spent  primarily in the minors, posting an ERA of 5.31 with a 6–8 record before getting the call up to the Rockies. Elarton posted a 6.27 ERA in 11 games in the majors.

Entering 2004, Elarton was competing for a starting spot in the Rockies rotation. After a good spring training, Elarton made the opening day roster as the 5th starter. Through 8 starts, he posted an ERA of 9.80 without winning a decision and also set a Colorado record for most consecutive decision losses to open a season, as he opened the season 0–6. The Rockies released him in mid-May.

Cleveland Indians (2004–2005)
After being released by the Rockies in 2004, he was signed to a Minor-League contract by Cleveland and was soon back in the Majors. He posted a 4.53 ERA and win–loss record of 3–5 and earned his first victory on July 29 against the Tigers, pitching 7 innings. On August 29, 2004, Elarton pitched the best game of his career against the Chicago White Sox, a two-hit complete game shutout, allowing only one walk and recording six strikeouts.

In 2005, Elarton spent his first season entirely in the Majors since 2001. He recorded his first double-digit winning season since 2000. He responded with an 11–9 record for the second-place Indians and a 4.61 ERA while ranking among the ten worst in home runs allowed for the second year in a row.

Kansas City Royals (2006–2007)
After the 2005 season, Elarton was signed as a free agent by the Kansas City Royals. In 2006, Elarton gave up Derek Jeter's 2000th career hit. Elarton was shut down after 20 starts, finishing with a 4–9 record and a strikeout/walk ratio of 3.8 (49 strikeouts, 52 walks) in 114 innings.

The Royals released him on July 25, 2007, after going 2–4 with a 10.46 ERA in 37 innings.

Return to the Cleveland Indians (2008)
He signed a Minor League contract with the Indians on August 3, 2007. He re-signed with the Indians on February 8, 2008, to a Minor League contract with an invitation to spring training. He was called up to the majors on May 24.  On July 8, Elarton was put on the 15-day disabled list with a non-baseball condition. He had been on the restricted list prior to that with what Indians manager Eric Wedge described as "personal issues."

Chicago White Sox (2010)
After taking a year off from baseball, Elarton signed a minor league deal with the White Sox. He appeared in just 16 games for their minor league affiliate Charlotte Knights after being hampered by a toe injury the whole season.

Philadelphia Phillies (2012)
Elarton spent the following years battling numerous injuries and remaining outside of professional baseball. He was at 299 pounds between 2009 and 2011. In 2011, a chance encounter with Philadelphia Phillies general manager Rubén Amaro, Jr. led to Elarton receiving a minor league contract with Phillies and an invitation the team's  spring training.

Elarton spent the whole year in the Phillies minor league affiliate Lehigh Valley IronPigs. He pitched in 26 starts, going 6–11 with an ERA of 5.41. At one point, Elarton had a 22 inning scoreless streak. For Elarton, it was just a matter of having love for the game again after appearing in just 16 games from 2009 to 2012.

Minnesota Twins (2013)
On December 11, 2012, the Minnesota Twins signed Elarton to a minor-league contract. but released him before the end of spring training. He then signed a contract with the Sugar Land Skeeters for the 2013 season.

Sugar Land Skeeters
Soon after being released by Minnesota, Elarton signed a contract to pitch for the Sugar Land Skeeters.  At the end of the 2013 season, he announced his retirement, where the crowd gave him a standing ovation.

Coaching career

Pittsburgh Pirates farm system
On January 14, 2014, it was announced that Elarton would serve as the pitching coach for the Gulf Coast League Pirates, the Gulf Coast League affiliate of the Pittsburgh Pirates. The following season, Elarton was named as the pitching coach for the Pirates' High-A affiliate, the Bradenton Marauders.

The next season, he was named a special assistant to the general manager in the Pirates' front office.

Scouting report
At 6 feet, 7 inches, Elarton would hide the ball well due to his tall frame, relying on a sinking two-seam fastball. At the time of his callup with the Astros, his fastball clocked at 93–95 MPH, but due to multiple shoulder injuries, it lost two to three miles per hour, reaching between 90 and 92 MPH. Elarton also threw a curveball, a changeup and a cutter. His propensity for being a flyball pitcher was the reason he gave up a lot of home runs.

References

External links

1976 births
Living people
Houston Astros players
Colorado Rockies players
Cleveland Indians players
Kansas City Royals players
People from Lamar, Colorado
Pittsburgh Pirates scouts
Baseball players from Colorado
Major League Baseball pitchers
Gulf Coast Astros players
Quad Cities River Bandits players
Kissimmee Cobras players
Jackson Generals (Texas League) players
New Orleans Zephyrs players
Round Rock Express players
Colorado Springs Sky Sox players
Buffalo Bisons (minor league) players
Wichita Wranglers players
Omaha Royals players
Charlotte Knights players
Lehigh Valley IronPigs players
Sugar Land Skeeters players